Maria Liana Mutia is an American para-Olympian in the sport of Judo. Maria Liana Mutia competed in the 2020 Summer Paralympics in Tokyo.

See also
Judo by country
List of celebrity judoka
List of judo techniques, partial list of judo techniques
List of judoka
List of World Champions in Judo

References

Living people
Place of birth missing (living people)
Year of birth missing (living people)
Paralympic judoka of the United States